Gaetano Chierici (1838–1920) was an Italian painter, mainly of genre works.

Biography
He was born in Reggio Emilia, and attended the Reggio Emilia School of Fine Arts in 1850 and 1851. Chierici continued his studies at the academies of Modena and Florence before completing his training in Bologna under the guidance of Giulio Cesare Ferrari. His early work was in Italy influenced by the Neo-classicism of his uncle, the artist Alfonso Chierici, and of Adeodato Malatesta, but subsequently by the innovations of the Macchiaioli painters. It was in the late 1860s that he took up anecdotal genre painting with domestic interiors, which came to be his field of specialisation. While the artist's participation in the Fine Arts Expositions at the Brera Academy of 1869 marked the beginning of his success with critics and collectors, his work subsequently declined into mechanical repetition of the same subjects. He was the director of the Workers’ School of Drawing in Reggio Emilia from 1882 to 1907 and the city's first Socialist mayor from 1900 to 1902.

In the Alfred O. Deshong Collection at the Widener University Art Gallery, there are two Chierici genre works on display: Child Feeding Her Pets, 1872 and The Hasty Pudding, 1883.

See also
 List of works by Gaetano Chierici

References
 Elena Lissoni, Gaetano Chierici , online catalogue Artgate by Fondazione Cariplo, 2010, CC BY-SA (source for the first revision of this article).

Other projects

19th-century Italian painters
Italian male painters
20th-century Italian painters
People from Reggio Emilia
Italian genre painters
1838 births
1920 deaths
19th-century Italian male artists
20th-century Italian male artists